Mine Hill is a mountain in Schoharie County, New York. It is located northwest of South Gilboa. Bald Mountain is located south and Woodchuck Hill is located north-northwest of Mine Hill.

References

Mountains of Schoharie County, New York
Mountains of New York (state)